Sound Suggestions is an album by the American jazz saxophonist George Adams recorded in 1979 and released on the ECM label.

Reception
The AllMusic review by Scott Yanow awarded the album 4 stars, stating: "The playing is advanced but not as fiery as most of Adams' later sets". The Penguin Guide to Jazz awarded the album 2½ stars, stating: "this was an uneasy collaboration, not really Adams's own session".

Track listing
All compositions by George Adams except as indicated
 "Baba" (Kenny Wheeler) - 13:00 
 "Imani's Dance" - 11:00 
 "Stay Informed" (Heinz Sauer) - 8:01 
 "Got Somethin' Good for You" - 5:42 
 "A Spire" (Wheeler) - 8:07
Recorded at Tonstudio Bauer, Ludwigsburg, West Germany in May 1979

Personnel
George Adams – tenor saxophone, vocals
Kenny Wheeler - trumpet
Heinz Sauer - tenor saxophone
Richard Beirach – piano
Dave Holland – bass
Jack DeJohnette – drums

References

ECM Records albums
George Adams (musician) albums
1979 albums
Albums produced by Manfred Eicher